Lubombo Conservancy-Goba Transfrontier Conservation Area, is a joint project between Mozambique and Swaziland, based on the Peace Park agreements. The park will include the following Area:

 Goba Conservancy (Mozambique.
 Goba Communial Land (Mozambique).
 Mlawula Game Reserve (Swaziland).
 Hlane Royal National Park (Swaziland).
 Mbuluzi Game Reserve (private property).
 Nkhalashane Ranch (government-owned)
 Shewula Community Nature Reserve.

It is expected that this TFCA will eventually be included into the: Greater Lubombo Transfrontier Conservation Area.

Map

See also
Protected areas of South Africa
List of conservation areas of Mozambique
Protected areas of Swaziland

Nature conservation in Mozambique
Protected areas of Eswatini
Transboundary protected areas